Ceropegia jainii is a species of flowering plant in the family Apocynaceae.

References 

jainii
Flora of India (region)